James Law (ca. 1560 – 12 November 1632) was Archbishop of Glasgow. Entering the church after graduation from university, he rose to the position of Bishop of Orkney, reorganising the diocese, before rising to hold the position of Archbishop of Glasgow.

Early life 
Law was born the son of James Law of Spittal, a portioner (minor landowner) of Lathrisk, east of Falkland in Fife, and of Agnes Strang of Balcaskie House, north of Pittenweem in Fife.

He graduated at the university of St Andrews M.A. in 1581 and was ordained and admitted minister of Kirkliston in West Lothian in 1585. During his incumbency there he, and John Spottiswoode, then minister of Calder (based in Mid Calder, Midlothian), afterwards archbishop of St Andrews, were censured by the synod of Lothian for playing football on a Sunday.

Bishop of Orkney 
In 1600 he was put on the standing commission of the church, in 1601 appointed one of the royal chaplains, in 1605 titular bishop of Orkney, and in 1608 moderator of the general assembly.  He preached before the Glasgow assembly of 1610 in defence of episcopacy. He supported the cause of the people of Orkney against the oppression of Patrick Stewart, Earl of Orkney, and succeeded in getting the lands and jurisdiction of the bishopric separated from those of the earldom.  He strengthened the rights and financial security of the bishopric of Orkney, and during his episcopate Scots Law replaced the earlier Norse Law for most purposes.

Towards the end of his Orkney tenure, Bishop Law had an important role in the aftermath of the 1614 rebellion of Robert, the son of Patrick Stewart, 2nd Earl of Orkney. Government forces suppressing the rebellion had besieged Kirkwall Castle and utterly demolished it at the order of the Privy Council of Scotland. A similar fate was intended for the St. Magnus Cathedral, in which rebels had hidden. The intervention of the Bishop prevented that from happening, saving the Cathedral - considered a fine example of Romanesque architecture.

Archbishop of Glasgow 
Through the influence of Archbishop Spottiswood, "his old companion at football and condiscipulus", he was promoted to the archbishopric of Glasgow in 1615, where he completed the leaden roof of the cathedral.  In 1616 he was appointed by the general assembly as one of a commission to prepare a book of canon for the church.

He died in 1632 and was buried in the chancel of Glasgow Cathedral (in the south-east corner), where there is a massive monument to his memory erected by his widow.  Law was a favourite of King James VI and a zealous promoter of his ecclesiastical policy. He was a man of some learning, leaving in manuscript commentary on a part of scripture, and was commemorated by Dr. Arthur Johnston in some Latin verses.

Marriage and family 
He married twice. His first marriage was to Marion, a daughter of James Dundas of Newliston, West Lothian.  They had one child, a daughter called Margaret, who married Patrick Turner, minister of Dalkeith, in 1612.  His second marriage was to Grissel Boswell, a daughter of John Boswell of Balmuto, and by her he fathered six children, four sons and two daughters: James Law of Brunton, Thomas Law, who later became the minister of Inchinnan, George Law, John Law, Jean Law, and Isobel Law. A great grandson of John Law was the economist John Law (1671-1729).

References 

 Keith, Robert, An Historical Catalogue of the Scottish Bishops: Down to the Year 1688, (London, 1824)

External links
  

Attribution

1560 births
1632 deaths
Alumni of the University of St Andrews
Roman Catholic archbishops of Glasgow
Bishops of Orkney
Members of the Convention of the Estates of Scotland 1617
Members of the Parliament of Scotland 1617
Members of the Convention of the Estates of Scotland 1621
Members of the Parliament of Scotland 1621
Moderators of the General Assembly of the Church of Scotland
Burials at Glasgow Cathedral
17th-century bishops of the Church of Scotland
Scottish bishops 1560–1638